The Brooksville Independent-Graded School District is a former school district in Brooksville, Kentucky. 

The District was founded in 1899, covering the City of Brooksville. It contained two schools, Brooksville Graded School and Brooksville High School. 

The district was superseded by the Bracken County School District in 1946.

References

School districts in Kentucky
Education in Bracken County, Kentucky
School districts established in 1899
1899 establishments in Kentucky